PDF often refers to the Portable Document Format in computing.

PDF, pdf, Pdf, PdF or similar may also refer to:

Computing and telecommunications
 Pop Directional Formatting (Unicode character U+202C), a formatting character in bi-directional formatting
 Printer description file, describing capabilities of PostScript printers
 Profile-directed feedback, a compiler optimization better known as Profile-Guided Optimization (PGO)
 Program Development Facility, in the IBM z/OS operating system
 Pair distribution function
 Powder Diffraction File
 Probability density function

Mathematics
 Probability density function
 Probability distribution function (disambiguation)

Organisations
 Parkinson's Disease Foundation, a medical foundation
 PDF Solutions, a company based in San Jose, California
 Peace Development Fund, a non-profit public foundation based in Amherst, Massachusetts

Military
 Panama Defense Forces
 People's Defense Force (Myanmar)
 People's Defence Force (Singapore)
 Permanent Defence Forces, the standing branches of Ireland's military

Politics
 Parti de la France
 People's Democratic Front (Hyderabad), a political party that existed in India during the early 1950s

Other uses
 PDF (gene), a gene that in humans encodes the enzyme peptide deformylase
 Palladium fluoride (PdF), a series of chemical compounds
Parton distribution function, in particle physics
 Peak draw force, in a compound bow in archery
 Percival David Foundation of Chinese Art
 Pigment dispersing factor, in biology
 Planar deformation features, in geology
 Playa del Fuego, a Delaware art festival

See also
 KPDF-CD, a television station in Phoenix, Arizona
 PDF417, or "portable data file 417", a two-dimensional barcode